DH44100 was a series of six diesel-hydraulic shunters bought by the Turkish State Railways from Maschinenbau Kiel in 1955. The units were very close to the DB Class V 65 used by Deutsche Bundesbahn.

External links
 Trains of Turkey page on DH44100

MaK locomotives
D locomotives

Turkish State Railways diesel locomotives
Standard gauge locomotives of Turkey
Railway locomotives introduced in 1955